Alan John Buckley (born 9 February 1977) is an Irish-Canadian actor. He is known for playing nerdy crime lab technician Adam Ross on the television series CSI: NY (2005–2013) and Navy SEAL Sonny Quinn on the television series SEAL Team (2017–present). He also had roles in Supernatural (2006–2014), The Box (2007), Home Sweet Hell (2015), and as the voice of Nash in The Good Dinosaur (2015).

Early life 
Buckley was born on 9 February 1977 in Dublin, Ireland. He immigrated at the age of six with his family to White Rock, British Columbia, Canada.

In his teens, Buckley began his acting career in the television series The Odyssey followed by guest starring roles in The X-Files and Millennium.

Buckley attended St. Thomas More Collegiate in Burnaby, near Vancouver.

Career 
Buckley appeared in the 1998 thriller science fiction film, Disturbing Behavior, alongside actress Katie Holmes. In 2001 he starred in an indie film Extreme Days a comedy-drama-romance flick. In 2005, Buckley was offered the part of Adam Ross on the hit crime drama CSI: NY. The part was supposed to be a recurring role, but by the end of the show's third season in 2007, he was offered a five-year contract. Before receiving the role of Adam Ross, Buckley had appeared as a different character on the original CSI: Crime Scene Investigation in a 2004 episode.

In 2006, the film Jimmy and Judy was released. When the CSI: NY episode featuring Buckley aired in 2006, director Randall K. Rubin called Buckley to discuss the success of an episode of CSI: NY, entitled "Down the Rabbit Hole" and the internet activity it had generated for Buckley. Harold Whaley, program director for Urban Network, suggested the idea of an in-world premiere featuring Buckley as a guest host and panellist for a post-screening Q&A.

Buckley stars as Sonny Quinn on SEAL Team, an American military drama television series that premiered on CBS for four seasons and switched to Paramount+ for the fifth and sixth seasons.

Personal life 
Buckley proposed to his girlfriend of two years, Abigail Ochse on 31 December 2012 while on vacation in Hawaii. On 3 September 2013 Buckley announced they were expecting a baby girl. The couple welcomed their daughter on 19 January 2014.  On 24 October 2014 while in New Zealand, Buckley fractured his arm and leg while running away during a "scare event."

In 2019, Buckley played on the "Away" roster during the NBA All-Star Celebrity Game at the Bojangles' Coliseum in Charlotte, North Carolina.

Filmography

Film

Television

Web

Video games

References

External links 
Official website

1977 births
Living people
20th-century Canadian male actors
21st-century Canadian male actors
Canadian expatriate male actors in the United States
Canadian male film actors
Canadian male television actors
Canadian male video game actors
Canadian male voice actors
Canadian people of Irish descent
Irish emigrants to Canada
People from White Rock, British Columbia